Iustin is a Romanian-language masculine given name that may refer to:

Iustin Frăţiman
Iustin Moisescu

Romanian masculine given names